Hombre Tenías que Ser  (You Had To Be A Man) is a Mexican telenovela produced by Azteca in 2013. It is a remake of Colombian telenovela, Hombres. On September 23, 2013, Azteca started broadcasting Hombre Tenías que Ser weeknights at 9:30pm, replacing Vivir a destiempo. The last episode was broadcast on February 14, 2014, with Avenida Brasil replacing it the following week.

Cast

Production
 Due to low ratings screenplay writers were dismissed from episode 54 and Eric Vonn entered as a writer from episode 55, he completely changes story on his own as an original.

References

External links

 

2013 telenovelas
2013 Mexican television series debuts
2014 Mexican television series endings
Mexican telenovelas
TV Azteca telenovelas
Mexican television series based on Colombian television series
Spanish-language telenovelas